Darina Gabániová (born 20 August 1955) is a Slovak dentist and politician. She served as a member of the National Council in 2002–2020 in the caucus of the Direction – Slovak Social Democracy party.

Gabániová graduated in dentistry from Comenius University in 1978 and later practiced in Košice. Since 1990, she has been teaching dentistry at the Comenius University.

Despite being a long-term member of parliament, Gabániová kept a low profile. In 2015, she was accused of opposition leaders Miroslav Beblavý and Igor Matovič of ties to the oligarch Juraj Široký. She defended the connection by claiming the businessman's family has standard European values.

References 

Direction – Social Democracy politicians
1955 births
Living people
Members of the National Council (Slovakia) 2002-2006
Members of the National Council (Slovakia) 2006-2010
Members of the National Council (Slovakia) 2010-2012
Members of the National Council (Slovakia) 2012-2016
Members of the National Council (Slovakia) 2016-2020
Female members of the National Council (Slovakia)
Academic staff of Comenius University
Comenius University alumni
21st-century Slovak women politicians